Barbara Garrick is an American actress. Garrick has appeared on stage, television and in film.

Life and career 
Garrick was born in Los Angeles, California. A graduate of the Juilliard School of Drama, she has several stage credits, including Eastern Standard, Stanley, and A Thousand Clowns.

She performed on several New York-based television shows, including several stints on soap operas. She portrayed the villainous nurse Charlotte Wheaton on Guiding Light in 1985, and on As the World Turns in 1999. She had several stints as cult follower Allison Perkins on One Life to Live, and first appeared as the character from 1986 to 1987, with subsequent stints from 2001 to 2003, and in 2008. Garrick returned to the show in its final few months and was a prominent part of its final episode on January 13, 2012. Her character Allison narrated the entire episode and spoke the show's final words, "Things are rarely what they appear."

Garrick played DeDe Halcyon Day in four television miniseries based on Armistead Maupin's Tales of the City novels: Tales of the City (1993), More Tales of the City (1998), Further Tales of the City (2001), and Tales of the City (2019). She was nominated for a Gemini Award in 1999 for Further Tales of the City. She also appeared in several episodes of the New York City-based procedural shows Law & Order, Law & Order: Criminal Intent, and Law & Order: Special Victims Unit, and was featured in the 1993 film Sleepless in Seattle.

Filmography

Film

Television

External links

Barbara Garrick credits – FilmReference.com
Barbara Garrick's official website

Actresses from Los Angeles
Actresses from New York City
American film actresses
American soap opera actresses
American television actresses
Circle in the Square Theatre School alumni
Living people
Year of birth missing (living people)
20th-century American actresses
21st-century American actresses